Andrey Volkov may refer to:
 Andrey Volkov (skier)
 Andrey Volkov (judoka)